The 2015 Scottish Rally Championship season was the 47th season of the Scottish Rally Championship, a rallying series run throughout Scotland over the course of a year. It was due to be contested over eight gravel rallies, but this was reduced to six events in 2015 after two rallies were cancelled. Points were awarded to the top placed drivers and the driver scoring the highest number of points over the season was declared Champion of the series.

The 2015 season began in the snow-covered forest tracks around Inverness on 21 February, with the season finale on 1 August, after the scheduled final event was cancelled. Jock Armstrong and regular co-driver Paula Swinscoe were declared champions following a consistent season where they scored two first and three second places. The Armstrong-Swinscoe pairing finished twelve points ahead of Bruce McCombie and Mike Faulkner. Faulkner clinched the runner-up position on countback, by two third places to one. Defending champions David Bogie and Kevin Rae won four rallies during the season – one of which being a class win behind the unregistered Dave Weston in Aberdeen – but their two retirements ultimately resulted in a fourth place championship position.

2015 calendar
For season 2015 there was to be eight events held on a variety of surfaces, but this was reduced to six following the cancellation of two events.

Calendar changes
On 24 April, the Merrick Stages Rally management team announced via a press release that the 2015 event – usually round 7 of the championship and held in September – would not take place. The team intended to concentrate on a new style event for 2016. A stand-in eighth event was expected to be announced by the SRC, however, after failing to obtain the agreement of all registered competitors it was decided to remain a seven event calendar for 2015.

The Colin McRae Forest Stages intended to trial a new format for 2015 with the event taking place over two days. Competitors contesting the event were to tackle 2 or 3 special stages on the Saturday before an overnight halt and then resume the rally on Sunday morning with another 2 or 3 stages. However, due to reduced entries the organising committee announced on 23 September that the event would have to be cancelled.

Competitors nominated their best five scores from the six previous events of the season to find the champion driver.

2015 events podium

Notes

Drivers' championship standings

Points were awarded to the highest placed registered drivers on each event as follows: 30, 28, 27, 26, and so on down to 1 point. At the end of the Championship, competitors nominated their best 5 scores out of the 6 events as their final overall Championship score.

References

External links
 
 RSAC Scottish Rally Homepage

Scottish Rally Championship seasons
Scottish Rally Championship
Scottish Rally Championship